DWAPS can refer to:

 The Dow Jones Asia/Pacific Small-Cap Total Stock Market Index
 Defense Warehousing Automated Processing System